J23 may refer to:

Roads 
 County Route J23 (California)
 Malaysia Federal Route J23

Vehicles 
 FVM J 23, a Swedish fighter aircraft
 GNR Class J23, a British steam locomotive
 , a Hunt-class minesweeper of the Royal Navy
 , an Östergötland-class destroyer of the Swedish Navy

Other uses 
 Agent J-23, a character in the Polish television series Stawka większa niż życie
 Gyroelongated square cupola, a Johnson solid (J23)
 J23, an album by Danny K